Borrowed Wives is a 1930 American pre-Code comedy film directed by Frank R. Strayer. It stars silent performers Vera Reynolds, Rex Lease, and Sam Hardy. It was distributed by Tiffany Pictures.

Plot
Peter Foley (Rex Lease) is a beneficiary of his grandfather, who leaves him $800,000 in his will, on the condition that he gets married. Peter is very interested in getting the money, especially since he has debts, and plans to marry Alice Blake (Vera Reynolds) as soon as she arrives from Kansas City. He plans to take her to his Uncle Henry's (Charles Sellon) home before midnight to actually get the inheritance. The uncle needs to see the girl whom Peter is about to marry before he will turn over the money.

Alice's airplane is delayed, though. Parker (Sam Hardy), Peter's creditor, insists that his own girl friend, Julia (Nita Martan), pose as Peter's wife in the meantime. Alice is informed by Joe Blair (Robert Livingston), a man who is secretly interested in marrying Alice himself, that Peter is actually married to Julia. Alice agrees to marry Joe if this is true. Peter and Julia are pursued by Bull (Paul Hurst), a motorcycle policeman who loves Julia. Further complications arise at Uncle Henry's, when lawyer Winstead (Harry Todd), who is found bound and gagged, agrees to marry them. The uncle, revealed to be posing as a paralytic, is exposed as a villain, but Peter and Alice are ultimately married before the last hour appointed in the will.

Cast
Rex Lease as Peter Foley
Vera Reynolds as Alice Blake
Nita Martan as Julia Thorpe
Paul Hurst as Bull Morgan
Robert Livingston as Joe Blair
Charles Sellon as Uncle Henry
Dorothea Wolbert as Aunt Mary
Sam Hardy as G.W. Parker
Harry Todd as Lawyer Winstead
Tom London as Mac - the Cop
Eddy Chandler as Police Sergeant

Preservation status
Borrowed Wives is preserved in the Library of Congress collection.

References

External links

1930 films
1930 comedy films
1930s English-language films
American black-and-white films
American comedy films
Articles containing video clips
Tiffany Pictures films
1930s American films